Ephoria dora is a moth in the Apatelodidae family. It was described by Schaus in 1896. It is found in south-eastern Brazil.

Description
The wingspan is about 50 mm. The forewings are greyish, thickly mottled with darker scales. The outer margin is broadly yellowish, with a very indistinct wavy basal line and a small yellowish spot containing a brown point in the cell. There is an irregular outer wavy shade separating the darker portion of the wing from the yellowish outer margin. The hindwings are light brown, somewhat yellowish on the outer margin.

Original publication
As Colabata dora, in

References

Natural History Museum Lepidoptera generic names catalog

Apatelodidae
Moths described in 1896